Elections were held in the Regional Municipality of Peel of Ontario on October 27, 2014, in conjunction with municipal elections across the province.

Mayoral campaigns were won by Allan Thompson in Caledon, Linda Jeffrey in Brampton, and Bonnie Crombie in Mississauga. Newly re-elected Mississauga councillor Frank Dale was voted by 14 of 24 Regional councillors as the new Chair of the Region of Peel.

Peel Regional Council

Regional chair
The list of individuals interested in candidacy include:
 Steve Mahoney, former MP, MPP, Mississauga Regional councillor
 Pat Mullin, former Mississauga Regional councillor
 Richard Paterak, former Caledon Regional councillor
 John Sanderson, former Brampton Regional councillor
 Shelley White, CEO, United Way of Peel
 Frank Dale, Mississauga City Councillor Ward 4

Hazel McCallion has cautioned current Mississauga councillors from seeking the seat, or voting for a current Regional councillor, as this would trigger a $500,000 by-election or an appointment. Frank Dale won the appointment by a single vote over John Sanderson which he cast for himself.

Brampton

The 2014 Brampton municipal election was held on October 27, 2014, in Brampton, Ontario, Canada, to elect the Mayor of Brampton, Brampton City Council and the Brampton members of the Peel District School Board (Public) and Dufferin-Peel Catholic District School Board. The election is being held in conjunction with the province wide 2014 municipal elections.

Mayor of Brampton
There are currently eleven Mayoral candidates in Brampton.

Withdrawn
 John Ish Ishmael, withdrew in February
 Fazal Khan, now registered as a candidate for Wards 2 & 6 on city council.
 Sewak Singh Manak

Polling
Forum Research for The Toronto Star, January 18, 2014

Forum Research for The Toronto Star, April 27, 2014

Forum Research for The Toronto Star, August 7 and 8, 2014 (1178 Brampton voters):

Forum Research for The Toronto Star, September 27, 2014 (928 Brampton voters):

Initials refer to candidates Hargy Randhawa, Gurjit Grewal, and Devinder Sangha.

Mainstreet Research, October 2, 2014:

Mainstreet Research, October 2, 2014, of only those certain to vote:

Forum Research for The Toronto Star, October 16, 2014 (1,020 Brampton voters):

Mainstreet Research, October 21, 2014 (1,602 Brampton voters):

Regional council

Withdrawn
 Wards 3 & 4: Janice Gordon, Ryan O'neil Knight
 Wards 7 & 8: Jacqueline Bell (became a candidate for Mayor), Clement Osei Tutu
 Wards 9 & 10: Gugni Gill Panaich (became the NDP candidate for Brampton West)

City council

Incumbent Grant Gibson won with a healthy margin, as did his close ally, Regional Councillor Elaine Moore. Gibson endorsed the candidacy of John Sanderson for mayor. Gibson and Elaine Moore were the only councillors to post their expenses online before the public focus on accountability. Gibson's top challengers were Steve Kerr, a certified youth counselor/education liaison and entrepreneur, and Maureen Harper, a veterinarian, recently retired from the Canadian Food Inspection Agency.

Withdrawn
 Wards 1 & 5: Wesley Rampersad, a former Region of Peel case worker, terminated in August 2013. Peel Regional Police Fraud Bureau investigations found a total of $189,000 was paid to what police allege were fake client claims. Detectives arrested Rampersad on charges May 1, 2014, laying multiple charges.
 Wards 3 & 4: Adam Holly, Kevin Montgomery (re-registered as a Regional Council candidate)
 Wards 7 & 8: Logan Anderson (re-registered as a candidate for Regional Council), Joseph Tanti

Timeline

2014
 January 7: The Star also runs an editorial critical of Fennell, suggesting that it is "becoming near-impossible to ignore Fennell's spending scandals and her attempts to keep the information secret, which have tainted her reputation as mayor and dominated city council," expressing concern that she is a distraction to the City, during its continued growth.
 February 10: John Sanderson registers as a candidate for mayor. The Globe notes Sanderson as the first "experienced challenger", highlighting his "extensive six-part platform".
 March 23: Brampton-Springdale MPP Linda Jeffrey (Liberal) confirms that she will resign as both a Member of Provincial Parliament and Municipal Affairs Minister on the March 25. She did not confirm that she was running for Mayor of Brampton, stating to The Star that she was the nominated candidate for the riding. Jeffrey is a former Brampton councillor. Both Fennell and Sanderson were quick to issue statements connecting her with Liberal government issues like eHealth, Ornge, and gas plant cancellations.
 March 24 and 25: A leaked memo reveals that Mayor Fennell asked the city treasurer to initiate a "stop of salary", at the end of October, before a salary report release. The move effectively dropped her from the position as Canada's highest paid mayor, by refusing acceptance of her November and December pay. Council must approve changes to the mayor's salary, and many councillors suggested the move was illegal. Sanderson questioned the act of cutting salary in the lead up to an election. Group Citizens For a Better Brampton questioned whether she can reverse the decision after the election, and receive the back owed pay.
 March 26: Susan Fennell issues a statement that she will be stepping aside from duties as mayor for an undisclosed period, as her husband has been admitted for open heart surgery. Regional Councillor John Sprovieri serves as acting mayor in a session of council. He will hold the position for the remainder of March; Bob Callahan was to by acting mayor in April. Later in the day, Fennell's spokesperson announces she will return by the next meeting of council.
 April 2:
 Former Councillor and MPP Linda Jeffrey enters the Mayoral race.
 Toronto Star runs a front-page story on Fennell and her staff's charges to City credit cards. An editorial says either Jeffrey or Sanderson "would be a better mayor than the incumbent."
 May 1: Linda Jeffrey launches her campaign.
 May 21: Fennell's privately run Mayor's Gala has only dispersed $442,005 to community groups in 2012 and 2013 combined, from $1,710,106 raised, little over a quarter of funds raised, Toronto Star reports.
 May 27: Toronto Star reports that a company owned by a "close personal friend" of Fennell has received 453 City contracts since 2001, all under the competitive tendering process minimum, totalling $1.1 million. The company, MeriMac, has also been paid by Fennell's own organization to organize its charitable gala and golf tournaments since 2008. Ching lives in a house owned by Fennell. An editorial the same day suggests that the Mayor's "years of misrule warrant a crushing defeat".
 May 28: A result of the Star article, City Council votes to replace Integrity Commissioner Donald Cameron, who had cleared Fennell. Once a new Commissioner is hired, councillors intend to file an immediate complaint on the grounds that the previous investigation was misled.
 May 29: Fennell goes on CBC Metro Morning to defend her actions, saying the Star story is "filled with inaccuracies"; the Star reiterates that Fennell and Ching refused to reply to repeated questions before the story was published. She assured host Matt Galloway she does not mix personal life and business. Also on CBC, Fennell commented that various councillors have been displaying "outrageous, shameful conduct". She described the tactic as "silly season" to get in the way of Brampton receiving a university campus.

 September 5: Social Justice Collaborative holds Brampton's first debate of the campaign, at the Peel Art Gallery, Museum and Archives. Coverage of the debate focused largely around spending practices by Fennell and council.
 September 10
 Before the final council meeting of the term, Fennell calls a press conference to announce she is pursuing legal action against critical councillors, the Toronto Star, and Deloitte Canada, which was hired by the City to do a forensic audit. "I've had it up to here with the lies the innuendo and the smears."
 September 12: Susan Fennell threatens to boycott the Brampton Board of Trade's debate, after several candidates suggested the event was anti-democratic and discriminatory. BBOT members were asked to vote on which candidates should attend. Jaipaul Massey-Singh, Board of Trade chair-elect, responded that the selection process was "in order to properly engage candidates in discussion of their platforms. The BBOT is concerned that if all candidates are invited to speak, individuals will then simply state their positions with little or no opportunity for them to challenge one another or for panelists to hold them accountable in their answers. Recent local debates that have invited all candidates to participate have shown this to be the case." If anyone does not participate, the BBOT will replace them with the candidate with the next highest number of votes.
 September 16: BBOT drops Susan Fennell from the BBOT debate. Self-employed farmer Jacqueline Bell will take the fourth spot, joining Jeffreys, Sanderson, and McLeod. Hargy Randhawa is also added. Devinder Sangha issues a press release calling their actions "knee jerk", suggesting Randhawa was "invited directly by the BBOT in spite of his entering the Mayoral race at the last minute and being the lowest voted candidate in the previous Mayoral election." Randhawa received over 13% of the vote in 2010, finishing fourth of five candidates.
 September 24: Brampton CAO John Corbett confirms that Deloitte has decided to "stop providing advice to the city." A new auditing firm must be hired to determine repayment amounts. Councillors talking to the media suggest that, due to legal action, the issue is impossible to revisit before the election.
 September 29: The BBOT debate at Sheridan College happens as scheduled. While Fennell remained uninvited, she talked to media outlets including CP24, and tweeted responses to the debate.
 October 2: Attention moved from Fennell to Jeffrey in the Brampton Young Professionals Forum debate, with the incumbent, Sanderson, and Sangha suggesting that the Province didn't help the City. Jeffrey suggested the City missed opportunities: "sat on the bench and did not chase the puck".
 October 5: A senior solicitor for Brampton, Colin Grant, is revealed to be no longer with the City.
 October 6:
 Fennell, Sanderson, and Jeffrey appear on CP24 program LeDrew Live. Fennell dubs the controversy as "manufactured scandals". Sanderson suggests Jeffrey double crossed him, suggesting during the ice storm that she was not interested in running for Mayor of Brampton.
 An anonymous attack ad, directed at Jeffrey, is released on YouTube. Citing its production values and professional narration, Jeffrey's campaign suggests that it is connected to a "well financed individual or group."
 October 16: A poll conducted by Forum finds 68% of voters want Fennell to resign, up from 63% in September.
 October 24:
 Arbitrator Janet Leiper released a report, finding that the amount to be owed by Fennell as $3,522.97, less than the roughly $34,000 indicated in the audit.
 After a press conference held by Fennell on the porch of her Terra Cotta Crescent house, supporters throw room-temperature coffee in the face of Toronto Star reporter San Grewal.
 November 26: United Way of Peel officials say they are looking into code of ethics complaints, related to CEO Shelley White's endorsement of Jeffreys.

Debates

Caledon

Registration for the 2014 election in Caledon had a slow start compared to other municipalities; the first Council registration was incumbent Gord McClure, on February 14.

Mayor of Caledon
There are currently two Mayoral candidates in Caledon.

Incumbent Marolyn Morrison is not seeking a fourth term in office; her husband intends to retire from teaching in 2015. Morrison experienced continued intimidation from developers throughout her term of office, including an attack on her husband that caused temporary vision damage.

Chris Harker, a former Ward 5 Regional Councillor, registered from August 13; he withdrew August 18, due to "a sudden and unforeseen personal matter".

Regional Councillor
Those elected as a Regional Councillor serve both on Town of Caledon council and Region of Peel council.

Area Councillor
Those elected as an Area Councillor serve only on the Town of Caledon council, not the Region of Peel council.

Debates

Mississauga

Mayor of Mississauga

The mayoral race in Mississauga was noted for the retirement of Hazel McCallion, who had served as the city's mayor since 1978 and often faced only token opposition in past campaigns, thus giving rise to the city's first genuinely competitive mayoral race in many years. The leading candidates were Bonnie Crombie and Steve Mahoney, both former Members of Parliament. A third former MP, Carolyn Parrish, was widely believed to be a potential candidate as well, but instead confirmed her intention to run for a council seat rather than for mayor.

Through much of the year, Mahoney and Crombie were effectively tied in public opinion polling; although Mahoney led slightly in most polls, his lead rarely exceeded the poll's margin of error. Both candidates' platforms were nearly identical, with the only substantive point of distinction between them being Mahoney's proposal to implement high-occupancy vehicle lanes on some city streets as an interim measure, while working toward the longer-term implementation of rapid transit improvements that both candidates favoured. In early October, however, McCallion made a speech in which, while stopping short of calling it an official endorsement, she appeared to favour Crombie as her successor; the speech almost immediately vaulted Crombie into a 25-point lead over Mahoney.

There were a total of 10 registered candidates.

Mike Shoss withdrew his nomination for mayor.

Endorsements

 Bonnie Crombie
 Mississauga: Stella Ambler, Hazel McCallion (implied only), Luz del Rosario, Paul Szabo
 Other: Dr. Carolyn Bennett, Dr. Kirsty Duncan, Art Eggleton, Andrew Kania, Dominic LeBlanc, Rob Oliphant, Yasmin Ratansi
 Steve Mahoney
 Mississauga: Brad Butt, Bob Dechert, Bob Delaney, Albina Guarnieri, Councillor Sue McFadden, Gurbax Singh Malhi, Harinder Takhar
 Other: Colleen Beaumier, Sarmite Bulte, Aileen Carroll, George Dadamo, Buzz Hargrove, John Manley, John McKay, Karen Redman, Brian Tobin

Polling
Forum Research, March

Forum Research, April

Forum Research, July

Forum Research, August

Forum Research, September 28 (557 respondents)

Forum Research, October 16 (769 respondents)

Awareness polls
In mid-September 2014, Mahoney commissioned a poll of 824 people using interactive voice response. Main Street Technologies added the names of the three Toronto mayoral front-runners to Mississauga front-runners' names, to demonstrate Mahoney's observation that many Mississauga residents were unaware of the municipal election or its candidates. Mahoney's internal polling found that 63 to 66% of Mississauga residents are undecided as to their choice for mayor.

City and Regional Council

Withdrawn
 Ward 3: Audrey Polanco
 Ward 5: Loveen Kaur Gill, Cheryl Rodricks
 Ward 6: Peter Ferreira 
 Ward 7: Amir Ali, Jozef Lech, Anwar Bilal Mughal
 Ward 8: David Sousa, Albert Tan

Note that Sidney Mondoux was registered for Ward 9, then to Ward 5, and will appear on the ballot for Ward 9.

Debates

School trustees

Peel District School Board
Janet McDougald was acclaimed as the chair of the Peel District School Board in a 1 December 2014 inaugural meeting.

Brampton
Wards 1, 5

Wards 2, 6
 Janet Atherley
 Michael Benoit
 William Davies
 Hardeep Kalirah
 Suzanne Nurse, incumbent
 Brittany Savaille
 Avtaar Soor
 Ravichandran Subbaian

Wards 3, 4
 Gurdeep Kaur Bhachu
 Lloyd Fournier
 Daljit Gill
 Rekha Joshi
 Ryan-O'Neil Knight
 Kathy McDonald
 Jagmohan Singh
 Stan Taylor

Wards 7, 8
 Devinder Singh Anand
 Carrie Andrews
 Shaheen Arshed
 Handell Patrick Buchanan
 Dezso Farkas
 Virginia Finbow
 Michael J. Gyovai
 Satpaul Singh Johal
 Christina MacLean
 Sunny Punia
 Amardeep Singh
 Lynne Lazare

Wards 9, 10

Withdrawn
 Wards 2, 6: Daniel Yeboah
 Wards 3, 4: Steve Kavanagh

Caledon
 Stan Cameron (X)

Mississauga
Wards 1 and 7
 Janet McDougald, incumbent
 Greg Vosper
 Stephen Warner

Wards 2 and 8
 Yve Bernard
 Sophia Brown Ramsay
 Andrew Hamilton-Smith
 Brad Hutchinson
 Brad MacDonald, incumbent
 Virinderpaul Singh
 Muhammad Waris

Wards 3 and 4
 Rita Bindra
 Evan Engering
 Sue Lawton, incumbent
 Goran Saveski

Ward 5
 Deepak Anand
 Jason Benoit
 Rita Bindra
 Yasmeen Khan
 Ranjit Kaur Khatkur
 Karen Lin
 Virinderpaul Singh
 Rick Williams

Ward 6
 Josephine Bau
 Bernadette Chatwin
 Robert Crocker
 Marina Pedrosa Hrenar
 Linden King
 David Li
 Sathyanithy Sadagopan
 Ravi Sahni
 Paramvir Singh Sekhon
 Keval Shaw
 Birinder Shergill
 Farina Siddiqui
 Pam Tomasevic
 George Winter

Ward 9 and 10
 Hussain A Asghar
 Cameron Bogren
 Sandra Clarke
 Nokha Dakroub
 Meredith Johnson
 Iftikhar Malik
 Shannon Pecore
 Dani Schulze
 Michael Sesek
 Malih Siddiqi
 Albert Tan
 Allison Van Wagner
 Kathy Vukobrat
 Kathy Zhao

Dufferin-Peel Catholic District School Board
Brampton wards 1, 3, 4
 Mike Campeau
 Anna Maria da Silva - Incumbent 
 Jefferson Huang
 Devanand Ramsumair

Brampton wards 2, 5, 6
 Darryl Brian D'Souza
 Denaize Joseph
 Thomas Joseph
 Frank R. Turner
 Carmen Wilson-Durston
Joseph Tanti withdrew his nomination, to run for Brampton City Council in Wards 7 & 8.

Brampton wards 7, 8, 9, 10
 Sylvia Aiello
 Mark Hoffberg
 Abraham Joseph
 Janice Gordon
 Mark Hoffberg
 Tara Elizebeth Nugent
 Lesley-Anne Raymer
 Shawn Xaviour

Caledon
 Krystina De Rose
 Frank Di Cosola
 Tony Meglio

Mississauga ward 1, 3
 Mario Pascucci
 Antu-Maprani Chakkunny

Mississauga ward 2, 8
 Corey Henderson
 Sharon M. Hobin, incumbent
 Arnold Rego

Mississauga ward 4
 Anna M. Abbruscato, incumbent
 Miroslaw Ruta

Mississauga ward 5
 Helene Burrowes
 Joseph Joseph

Mississauga ward 6, 11
 Josephine Bau
 Natalia Kusendova
 Luz del Rosario

Mississauga ward 7
 Patti-Ann Finlay
 Bruno Iannicca, incumbent

Mississauga ward 9, 10
 Esther O'Toole, incumbent

Conseil scolaire Viamonde
The following candidates are running in all of Peel. Locally, the schools represented are École élémentaire Carrefour des jeunes, École élémentaire Horizon Jeunesse, and École secondaire Jeunes sans frontières.

 Malika Attou, St. Catharines
 Mark David de Pelham, Mississauga
 Kris Nair, Mississauga
 Yvon Rochefort, Brampton

 Withdrawn: Ravi Sahni

Conseil scolaire de district catholique Centre-Sud
Brampton and Caledon
 École élémentaire catholique Sainte-Jeanne-d'Arc.

 Geneviève Grenier
 Tammy Knibbs
 Blaise Liaki

Mississauga
 Schools represented locally in École élémentaire catholique René-Lamoureux, École élémentaire catholique Saint-Jean-Baptiste, and École secondaire catholique Sainte-Famille.

 Estelle Ah-Kiow
 Innocent Legrand Watat

Additional debates

References

External links
 Municipal election, City of Brampton
 List of candidates
 Editorial board interviews by the Brampton Guardian: Fennell, Jeffrey, Sanderson
 Elections, Town of Caledon
 List of candidates
 Municipal elections, City of Mississauga 
 List of candidates

Peel
Regional Municipality of Peel